The Concern for the Nation Functional Party is a political party in Indonesia. The party was established by former members of the Golkar Party who were dissatisfied with Golkar's abandonment of former president Suharto including former minister Hartono and Suharto's daughter Siti Hardiyanti Rukmana. Suharto himself approved the party name.

In the 2004 legislative election, the party won 2.1% of the popular vote and 2 out of 500 seats in the Regional Representatives Council. In the 2009 legislative election, the party won only 1.4 percent of the votes, less than the 2.5 percent electoral threshold, meaning it lost both seats in the Council, as well as receiving no seats in the People's Representative Council.

Regional strength
In the legislative election held on 9 April 2009, support for the PKPB was higher than the party's national average in the following provinces:

West Sumatra 1.4%

Bengkulu 2.2%

Jambi 2.5%

South Sumatra 1.7%

Lampung 2.7%

West Java 1.8%

Banten 1.8%

Yogyakarta 1.7%

West Kalimantan 1.9%

South Kalimantan 1.7%

Bali 1.5%

West Nusa Tenggara 2.4%

East Nusa Tenggara 1.7%

West Sulawesi 1.6%

Central Sulawesi 2.4%

South East Sulawesi 2.8%

References
 Daniel Dhakidae (ed)(2005) Wajah DPR dan DPD 2004-2009 (Faces of the DPR and DPD 2004-2009) Penerbit Buku Kompas, Jakarta 
 General Election Commission results page (Indonesian) accessed 20/7/08
 Kompas newspaper Profil Partai Politik (Profile of Political Parties), 14 July 2008 pp. 38–39
 Tempo magazine After Two Presidents, No. 0931/March 31-April 6, 2009, pp30–31

Notes

Pancasila political parties
Political parties in Indonesia